The 1974 Illinois Fighting Illini football team was an American football team that represented the University of Illinois in the 1974 Big Ten Conference football season. In their fourth year under head coach Bob Blackman, the Illini compiled a 6–4–1 record and finished in fifth place in the Big Ten Conference.

The team's offensive leaders were quarterback Jeff Hollenbach with 1,037 passing yards, running back Chubby Phillips with 772 rushing yards, and wide receiver Joe Smalzer with 525 receiving yards. Hollenbach and linebacker Tom Hicks were selected as the team's most valuable players.

Schedule

References

Illinois
Illinois Fighting Illini football seasons
Illinois Fighting Illini football